The Evangelical Lutheran Church of Colombia (Iglesia Evangélica Luterana de Colombia) is a Lutheran denomination in Colombia. It is a member of the Lutheran World Federation, which it joined in 1966.

External links 
Iglesia Evangélica Luterana en Colombia official website
Lutheran World Federation listing

Lutheran denominations
Lutheranism in South America
Lutheran World Federation members